Surface finishing is a broad range of industrial processes that alter the surface of a manufactured item to achieve a certain property. Finishing processes may be employed to: improve appearance, adhesion or wettability, solderability, corrosion resistance, tarnish resistance, chemical resistance, wear resistance, hardness, modify electrical conductivity, remove burrs and other surface flaws, and control the surface friction. In limited cases some of these techniques can be used to restore original dimensions to salvage or repair an item. An unfinished surface is often called mill finish.

Surface finishing processes can be categorized by how they affect the workpiece:

Removing or reshaping finishing
Adding or altering finishing

Mechanical processes may also be categorized together because of similarities the final surface finish.

Adding and altering
Blanching
Burnishing
Calendering
Case hardening
Ceramic glaze
Cladding
Corona treatment
Diffusion processes:
Carburizing
Nitriding
Electroless plating
Electroplating
Galvanizing
Gilding
Glazing
Knurling
Painting
Passivation/Conversion coating
Anodizing
Bluing
Chromate conversion coating
Phosphate conversion coating
Parkerizing
Plasma electrolytic oxidation
Peening
Shot peening
Laser peening
Pickling
Plasma spraying
Powder coating
Thin-film deposition
Chemical vapor deposition (CVD)
Electroplating
Electrophoretic deposition (EPD)
Mechanical plating
Sputter deposition
Physical vapor deposition (PVD)
Vacuum plating
Vitreous enamel

Removing and reshaping
Abrasive blasting
Sandblasting
Burnishing
Chemical-mechanical planarization (CMP)
Electropolishing
Electrochemical machining
Flame polishing
Gas cluster ion beam
Grinding
Industrial etching
Laser ablation
Laser engraving
Linishing
Magnetic field-assisted finishing
Mass finishing processes
Tumble finishing
Vibratory finishing
Peening
Shot peening
Laser peening
Pickling
Polishing
Buffing
Lapping
Superfinishing

Mechanical finishing
Mechanical finishing processes include:

Abrasive blasting
Sandblasting
Burnishing
Grinding
Honing
Mass finishing
Tumble finishing
Vibratory finishing
Polishing
Buffing
Lapping

The use of abrasives in metal polishing results in what is considered a "mechanical finish".

Metal finish designations 

 #1 Finish
Annealed and descaled after hot rolling, this finish is suitable for industrial applications requiring heat resistance and corrosion resistance, where smoothness of finish is unimportant, such as chemical tanks, aircraft heaters, steam turbine shrouds and piping.

 #3 Finish
Also known as grinding, roughing or rough grinding. These finishes are coarse in nature and usually are a preliminary finish applied before manufacturing. An example would be grinding gates off of castings, deburring or removing excess weld material. It is coarse in appearance and applied by using 36–100 grit abrasive.

When the finish is specified as #3, the material is polished to a uniform 60–80 grit.

 #4 Architectural finish
Also known as brushed, directional or satin finish. A #4 architectural finish is characterized by fine polishing grit lines that are uniform and directional in appearance. It is produced by polishing the metal with a 120–180 grit belt or wheel finish and then softened with an 80–120 grit greaseless compound or a medium non woven abrasive belt or pad.

 #4 Dairy or sanitary finish
This finish is commonly used for the medical and food industry and almost exclusively used on stainless steel. This finish is much finer than a #4 architectural finish. This finish enhances the physical appearance of the metal as well as increases the sanitary benefits. One takes great care to remove any surface defects in the metal, like pits, that could allow bacteria to grow. A #4 dairy or sanitary finish is produced by polishing with a 180–240 grit belt or wheel finish softened with 120–240 grit greaseless compound or a fine non woven abrasive belt or pad.

 #6 Finish
Also known as a fine satin finish. This finish is produced by polishing with a 220–280 grit belt or wheel softened with a 220–230 greaseless compound or very fine non woven abrasive belt or pad. Polishing lines will be soft and less reflective than a #4 architectural finish.

 #7 Finish
A #7 finish is produced by polishing with a 280–320 belt or wheel and sisal buffing with a cut and color compound. This is a semi-bright finish that will still have some polishing lines but they will be very dull. Carbon steel and iron are commonly polished to a #7 finish before chrome plating. A #7 finish can be made bright by color buffing with coloring compound and a cotton buff. This is commonly applied to keep polishing costs down when a part needs to be shiny but not flawless.

 #8 Finish
Also known as a mirror finish. This finish is produced by polishing with at least a 320 grit belt or wheel finish. Care will be taken in making sure all surface defects are removed. The part is sisal buffed and then color buffed to achieve a mirror finish.  The quality of this finish is dependent on the quality of the metal being polished. Some alloys of steel and aluminum cannot be brought to a mirror finish. Castings that have slag or pits will also be difficult, if not impossible, to polish to a #8.

See also
Industrial finishing
Surface engineering
Surface science
Textile finishing

References

Notes

Bibliography
.

 
Grinding and lapping

ca:Acabat